The beach soccer competition at the 2017 Commonwealth Youth Games was held in Nassau, Bahamas from 19 to 22 July 2017 at the National Beach Soccer Arena, at Malcolm Park.

Two events took place, the boys' tournament and the girls' tournament. A total of eight teams from six countries took part; each consisting of ten players for a total of 80 competing athletes – 40 boys and 40 girls. All competitors were aged between 16 and 18.

Each respective event began with a round robin group stage. The teams in 1st and 2nd place advanced to the gold medal match. The teams in 3rd and 4th advanced to the bronze medal match. The boys' event was won by Saint Lucia and the girls event was won by Trinidad and Tobago.

Medalists

Medal table

Results

Boys

Group stage

(H) Hosts

Bronze medal match

Gold medal match

Girls

Group stage

(H) Hosts

Bronze medal match

Gold medal match

References

External links
Bahamas 2017, official website (archived)
Commonwealth Youth Games - Beach Soccer, at Beach Soccer Worldwide 

2017 Commonwealth Youth Games events
Commonwealth Youth Games
2017 Commonwealth Youth Games